The Cumberland Valley League was a four–team Independent level baseball minor league that played in the 1896 season. The Cumberland League featured franchises based in Maryland and Pennsylvania. The Cumberland Valley League permanently folded after playing the 1896 season.

History
Before becoming a minor league, a semi–professional league named the "Cumberland Valley League" played in the 1895 season.

The Cumberland Valley League was first organized as a minor league on May 15, 1896. The Cumberland Valley League formed as an Independent level league. The Carlisle Colts, Chambersburg Maroons, Hagerstown Lions and Hanover Tigers were the charter members beginning play the four–team league. The league president was Eugene S. Faber.

The Cumberland Valley League began play on June 10, 1896. During the season, the Hanover Lions relocated to York, Pennsylvania on August 1, 1894, and back to Hanover on August 8. On August 7, 1894, the Chambersburg Maroons folded, causing the Cumberland Valley League to permanently fold on August 9, 1896, with only three teams remaining.

The Final Cumberland Valley League standings were led by the 1st place Hagerstown Lions. Hagerstown had a 26–12 record. The Chambersburg Maroons finished 3.0 games behind Hagerstown with a 22–14 record, followed by the Carlisle Colts (14–13) and Hanover Tigers/York (12–25).

The Cumberland Valley League played only the 1896 season.

Cumberland Valley League teams

Standings & statistics

1896 Cumberland Valley League

References

Defunct minor baseball leagues in the United States
Baseball leagues in Pennsylvania
Defunct professional sports leagues in the United States
Sports leagues established in 1896
Sports leagues disestablished in 1896